The Presbyterian Church in Korea (HapDongYunHap) is a Reformed and Presbyterian denomination in South Korea. It adheres to the Apostles Creed and Westminster Confession. In 2004 the denomination had 85,841 members in almost 400 congregations served by 314 ordained pastors.

References 

Presbyterian denominations in South Korea
Presbyterian denominations in Asia